Ying Er (born 12 December 1988) is a Chinese actress. Her real name is Liu Ying. She is best known for her roles in the television series Sealed with a Kiss, Xiao Ju's Spring Day and Decoded.

Filmography

Film

Television series

Discography

Awards and nominations

References

External links 
 

1988 births
Living people
Actresses from Hunan
Chinese film actresses
Chinese television actresses
Central Academy of Drama alumni
21st-century Chinese actresses